True Heroes may refer to:
True Heroes (event), an event organised in 2004 related to the role-playing game True Adventures
True Heroes (TV series), a 2003 television series in Singapore